The Rhodocyclales  are an order of the class Betaproteobacteria in the phylum "Pseudomonadota". Following a major reclassification of the class in 2017, the previously monofamilial order was split into three families:

Rhodocyclaceae (type family) contains the genera Rhodocyclus (type genus), Azospira and Propionivibrio. Cells are curved rods, rings or spirillae. Dominant respiratory quinones are menaquinone-8, ubiquinone-8 and rhodoquinone-8. G+C fractions are 61.6 - 65.3 mol%.
Azonexaceae contains the genera Azonexus (type genus), Dechloromonas, Ferribacterium and Quatrionicoccus. Cells are curved rods or cocci. Dominant respiratory quinone is ubiquinone-8.  G+C fractions are 63.5 - 67.0 mol%.
Zoogloeaceae contains the genera Zoogloea (type genus), Thauera, Uliginosibacterium and Azoarcus. Cells are rod shaped. Dominant respiratory quinones are ubiquinone-8 and rhodoquinone-8. G+C fractions are 59.3 - 69.0 mol%.

The genus Azovibrio also falls within the order but is incertae sedis, falling between the Zoogloeaeceae and the Azonexaceae.

References

 
Betaproteobacteria